Al Mirqab may refer to:
Al Mirqab (Doha), a district in Qatar
Al Mirqab (yacht), a yacht
Mirgab, an area in Kuwait City, Kuwait